Varsken (Middle Persian: Vazgēn) was an Iranian prince from the Mihranid family of Gugark, who served as the  (margrave) of the region from 470 to 482. He was the son and successor of Arshusha II. 

Upon the death of his father, Varsken went to the Sasanian capital of Ctesiphon and was received by the  Peroz I, converting to the family's former religion, Zoroastrianism. As a reward for his conversion, he was given the viceroyalty of Caucasian Albania and a daughter of Peroz in marriage. 

Espousing his pro-Iranian position, Varsken attempted to force his family to convert to Zoroastrianism, including his first wife Shushanik, which eventually resulted in her martyrdom, dying from the violence inflicted by her husband. His policies were unacceptable to the Iberian king Vakhtang I, who had him killed and then revolted against Iran in 482. Varsken was succeeded by Arshusha III.

Biography 

Not much earlier, the Iberian Kingdom had fallen under the authority of the Sasanians, who under Shapur II installed Aspacures II on the Iberian throne in 363.

Albeit the family claimed descent from the Persian Sasanian rulers of Iran, they were in reality a branch of the House of Mihran, one of the Seven Great Houses of Iran. Under Peroz the family abandoned its Zoroastrian beliefs in favour of Christianity. The Mihranids of Gugark enjoyed close relations with the Iberian kings (also of Mihranid descent), with whom they intermarried. 

Varsken's mother was Anushvram Artsruni, an Armenian noblewomen from the Artsruni family, who was the sister-in-law of the Armenian military leader Hmayeak Mamikonian, himself brother of the Armenian rebel and martyr Vardan Mamikonian. Varsken's father, Arshusha II, was a hostage of the Sasanian court at Ctesiphon, and could not participate in the Christian Armenian rebellion in 451, led by Vardan Mamikonian. After the defeat of the Armenian rebels at Avarayr, Hmayeak Mamikonian was killed at Tao. Hmayeak's sons, Vahan Mamikonian, Vasak, Vard and Artaxias, were then taken hostage and sent to Ctesiphon, where they met Arshusha II. Arshusha was later able to buy his freedom back. He then freed the sons of Hmayeak, and took them back to Armenia with their mother. Later, Arshusha organized the wedding of his son Varsken with Shushanik, daughter of Vardan Mamikonian. 

Upon the death of his Arshusha, Varsken went to Ctesiphon and was received by the Sasanian  Peroz I, converting to the family's former religion, Zoroastrianism. He also shifted his allegiance from the Christian Iberian monarchy to the Sasanian Empire. As a reward for his conversion, he was given the viceroyalty of Caucasian Albania and a daughter of Peroz in marriage. 

The basilica of Bolnisi Sioni in Iberia is a testimony of the growing Sasanian influence there. It was constructed in 478/479 in the southern part of the country, which had fallen under the control of the Mihranids. The reports of the contemporary Iberian historian Iakob Tsurtaveli indicates that Varsken was a sovereign in his own right, and acknowledged the suzerainty of the  only as a counterbalance to the Iberian kings.

Espousing his pro-Iranian position, Varsken attempted to force his family to convert to Zoroastrianism, including Shushanik, which eventually resulted in her martyrdom, dying from the violence inflicted by her husband. His Zoroastrianizing efforts were seemingly only limited to that of his family. There are no reports of attempts to convert his Christian subjects, and the main source for Shushanik's life—the Martyrdom of the Holy Queen Shushanik—does not consider the martyrdom of his wife as part of a systematic Christian persecution. His policies were unacceptable to the Iberian king Vakhtang I, who had him killed and then revolted against Iran in 482. Varsken was succeeded by Arshusha III.

Genealogy

References

Sources 
 
 
 
 
 
  Histoire de l'Arménie: des origines à 1071, Paris, 1947.
 
 
 
 
  
 
  
  

482 deaths
Year of birth unknown
5th-century Iranian people
Mihranids
Converts to Zoroastrianism from Christianity
Zoroastrian rulers
Vassal rulers of the Sasanian Empire
Caucasian Albania
Governors of the Sasanian Empire
Peroz I